Roman Leonidovich Karimov (born June 20, 1984)  is a Russian film director, screenwriter, composer, editor and producer.

References

External links

1984 births
Living people
Writers from Ufa
Russian film directors
Russian screenwriters
Russian film score composers
Musicians from Ufa